Shefali Jariwala (born 17 December), better known as the Kaanta Laga Girl, is an Indian actress and model who has appeared in several Hindi music videos, reality shows and a Kannada film. She became noted when she appeared in the famous music video Kaanta Laga and played Bijli in the film Mujhse Shaadi Karogi with Akshay Kumar and Salman Khan. Later, she participated in the dance reality shows Nach Baliye 5 and Nach Baliye 7 along with Parag Tyagi. In 2018, she played the female lead in ALT Balaji's web series Baby Come Naa opposite Shreyas Talpade. In 2019, she participated in the controversial reality show Bigg Boss 13.

Personal life

Shefali Jariwala was married to musician Harmeet Singh from Meet Brothers in 2004. The couple divorced in 2009 where Shefali pressed charges against Harmeet. Later, she married actor Parag Tyagi in 2015. Shefali Jariwala is a graduate with degree in Computer Applications.

Career

Shefali became famous for appearing in a song in the 2002 video album Kaanta Laga. Due to the  popularity of the song, she became known as The Thong Girl. After Kaanta Laga she appeared few other music albums. She also had a presence in the movie Mujhse Shaadi Karogi.

Filmography

Television

Films

Music and Music Videos

References

External links

 
 
 

Living people
Gujarati people
Actresses from Ahmedabad
Indian female dancers
Indian film actresses
Actresses in Hindi cinema
Actresses in Gujarati cinema
21st-century Indian actresses
Reality dancing competition contestants
Dancers from Gujarat
Bigg Boss (Hindi TV series) contestants
Sardar Patel Institute of Technology alumni
Year of birth missing (living people)